Elections to the Labour Party's Shadow Cabinet (more formally, its "Parliamentary Committee") occurred in November 1963. In addition to the 12 members elected, the Leader (Harold Wilson), Deputy Leader (George Brown), Labour Chief Whip (Herbert Bowden), Labour Leader in the House of Lords (A. V. Alexander), and Labour Chief Whip in the House of Lords (the Earl of Lucan)  were automatically members.

All existing members of the Shadow Cabinet were re-elected.  However, as Wilson had succeeded to the leadership of the party, he did not need to stand in the election, and Douglas Jay won the newly available seat.

References

1963
Labour Party Shadow Cabinet election
Labour Party Shadow Cabinet election